Neil Alexander Simpson (born 15 November 1961) is a Scottish former footballer, who played for Aberdeen, Newcastle United, Motherwell and Scotland.

Simpson, nicknamed "Simmie", was born in London to Scottish parents who soon moved back to Newmachar in their native Aberdeenshire, where he was brought up. Joining Aberdeen from local junior side Middlefield Wasps, he made 310 appearances in all competitions (27 as substitute) and scored 31 goals.

Playing career

After breaking into the Aberdeen first team at the end of 1980, Simpson finished the season as a first-team regular. Until recurring injuries curtailed his appearances from the spring of 1986, he was a key player for the Dons. A reliable ball-winner, he won his first major honour for the team he had supported as a boy in the 1982 Scottish Cup. Between 1982 and 1986, Simpson's Pittodrie career gained him a list of domestic winners medals that included two Scottish league championships, three Scottish Cups and a Scottish League Cup.

Simpson played in the 1981–82 UEFA Cup campaign which saw the Dons make their first-ever run of success in Europe by progressing to the Third Round at the expense of Bobby Robson's Ipswich Town and FC Argeş Piteşti of Romania. In 1982–83, he played in every one of the matches of the Dons' 1983 European Cup Winners Cup campaign, scoring a goal in the 3–2 victory over FC Bayern Munich in the second leg of the quarter-finals and becoming one of the "Gothenburg Greats" who lifted the trophy after beating Real Madrid in the 1983 Final. The following season, Simpson was in the team that reached the semi-finals of the 1984 European Cup Winners Cup and he scored a goal when Aberdeen won the 1983 UEFA Super Cup. In 1985–86, he helped the team to the quarter-finals of the 1986 European Champions Cup.

In March 1986, Simpson suffered an injury which kept him out for the rest of the season. On 9 August, 1986, four minutes into the new season, he incurred an ankle injury that restricted him to only eight league appearances in the spring of 1987. He was never to fully recover. He made only 15 league appearances in 1987–88 and 16 in 1988–89.

Simpson made the tackle that injured Ian Durrant of Rangers in October 1988, leaving him out of action for two and a half years. This further increased the hostility between supporters of both clubs, which exists to this day. In 1993, Simpson and Durrant settled out of court for an undisclosed sum after Durrant sued for damages.

Simpson's own injury problems continued, restricting him to nine league appearances 1989–90 and a move to Newcastle United saw him play a mere four times. He went to Motherwell for 1991–92 where he spent two seasons before leaving for Highland Football League side Cove Rangers, where he ended his playing career in October 1993.

Simpson was awarded a testimonial match by Aberdeen in 2012, which was played against a Manchester United XI on 14 August 2012.

International

Having played in the Scotland Under-17 and Under-18 sides and captained the Under-21 team, Simpson made his full Scotland debut in the penultimate British Home Championship against Northern Ireland at Hampden, which ended in a goalless draw. In the 1983–84 season he appeared in two friendlies, beating Uruguay 2–0 and losing 2–0 to France. His last two matches for Scotland were against England in the Rous Cup, drawing 0–0 at Hampden in 1987 and losing 1–0 at Wembley the next year.

Coaching career
After retiring from playing, Simpson became an SFA Community Development Officer in Moray. He returned to Aberdeen in 2001 and became their Head of Youth.

Career statistics

Club 
Appearances and goals by club, season and competition

International

Appearances and goals by national team and year

See also
 List of Scotland international footballers born outside Scotland

References

External links

1961 births
Living people
Aberdeen F.C. players
Motherwell F.C. players
Newcastle United F.C. players
English people of Scottish descent
Scottish footballers
Scotland international footballers
Scotland B international footballers
People from Garioch
Anglo-Scots
English Football League players
Scottish Football League players
Cove Rangers F.C. players
Scotland under-21 international footballers
Highland Football League players
Association football midfielders
Footballers from Aberdeenshire